State Road 15 (SR 15) is part of the Florida State Road System. This route is part of a multi two-state route 15 that begins at Florida and ends at Georgia at the North Carolina state line.

Route description
SR 15 runs from SR 80/SR 880 at Belle Glade north along the east shore of Lake Okeechobee to Okeechobee. Then it runs north to SR 500 (US 192) at Holopaw, and northwest along SR 500 to Ashton (east of St. Cloud), where it ends.

County Road 15 in Osceola County and Orange County connects to the beginning of the next section, at SR 528 (the Bee Line Expressway) east of Orlando International Airport. From there, SR 15 travels north on Narcoossee Road, west on Hoffner Road, north on Conway Road through Conway, west on Lake Underhill Road, and west on South Street (northbound) and Anderson Street (southbound) on both sides of SR 408 to downtown Orlando. It then travels north on Mills Avenue and follows US 17 all the way to downtown Jacksonville. From there it follows Interstate 95 to the Martin Luther King Jr. Parkway, and then northwest into Georgia, as Georgia State Route 15.

SR 15 is practically unsigned, except in three places:
 from the south end to US 98 / US 441 north of Belle Glade
 SR 528 to SR 50 in downtown Orlando
from U.S. 17/92 & FL 46 to I-4 & U.S. 17/92 Interchange (Co-signed with SR 500)
The rest is signed as various U.S. Highways:
 US 441 from north of Belle Glade to the end of the first section, east of St. Cloud
 US 17 from Orlando to Jacksonville
 US 1 / US 23 from Jacksonville to Georgia
 US 301 from Callahan to Georgia (co-signed with US 1 and US 23)

History
Prior to the 1945 renumbering, the route that became SR 15 had the following numbers:
 SR 143 from Belle Glade to Canal Point
 SR 194 from Canal Point to south of Okeechobee
 SR 29 from south of Okeechobee to Orlando
 SR 24 from Holopaw to Ashton
 SR 3A in downtown Orlando
 SR 3 from Orlando to south of Jacksonville, Florida
 SR 21 north of downtown DeLand
 SR 28 from San Mateo to Palatka
 SR 14 from East Palatka to Palatka
 SR 48 in Green Cove Springs
 SR 363 from south of Jacksonville to Jacksonville
 SR 3 in downtown Jacksonville
 SR 4 from Jacksonville, Florida to Georgia

SR 15 was defined in the 1945 renumbering as:
 Extending from SR 80 in Belle Glade in Palm Beach County in a general Northwesterly direction along Lake Okeechobee via Pahokee to Okeechobee then Northwesterly to a junction with SR 500 at Holopaw and along SR 500 to Ashton, then continuing Northwesterly to a junction with SR 600 in Orlando and along SR 600 to an intersection with SR 46 at 25th St. in Sanford, then along SR 600 and SR 46 to First St. then along SR 600 across St. Johns River to an intersection with SR 40 and SR 44 in DeLand, then along SR 600 and SR 40 to a point North of DeLand and along SR 40 to Barberville, then Northwesterly via Pierson, Crescent City and Satsuma to a junction with SR 20 and SR 100 at San Mateo, then along SR 20 and SR 100 via East Palatka to an intersection of SR 20 and SR 100 at Reid St. and 7th St. in Palatka, then along SR 100 to an intersection of SR 100 and SR 15 on Madison St. near the NW City Limits of Palatka, then Northwesterly to SR 16 in Green Cove Springs and along SR 16 to Orange Ave., then in a Northwesterly direction via Orange Park, Jacksonville, and Callahan to the St. Mary's River at the Georgia State Line.
 Also proposed route running North and Northwest from junction with SR 500 at Holopaw to a point near the Orange County and Osceola County Line on SR 15.
 Also from a point on SR 15 and SR 600 North of Longwood in Seminole County in a Northerly direction to intersection with SR 15 and SR 600 just South of St. Johns River at the Volusia County and Seminole County Line.
 Also a proposed route from a point on SR 15 North of Satsuma, North to intersection with SR 15 and SR 100 in Palatka.

Neither proposed route was built. The alternate route in Seminole County was going to be a bypass of Sanford, but construction of SR 400 (Interstate 4) relegated it to a minor road, and it became CR 15 in the 1980s.

The main route has stayed mostly the same. Here are the places where the route now differs:
 The south end of SR 15 has stayed the same, but SR 80 has moved to the north, and thus the first three miles (5 km) of SR 15 is also SR 80.
 SR 15 is now CR 15 in Osceola County and Orange County from SR 500 in Ashton to SR 528 east of Orlando International Airport.
 SR 15 originally went from Conway to Orlando along Conway Road, but then turned west at Curry Ford Road and used Briercliff Drive, Delaney Avenue, and Gore Street to reach SR 527. The part of the old alignment on Curry Ford Road became part of SR 526A when SR 15 was moved.
 Until around 1975, when the Mills Avenue Extension was built, SR 15 continued west from Mills Avenue along what is now SR 5098, and then went north on SR 527 through downtown Orlando, returning to the current route via SR 50.
 When the 20th Street Expressway was built in Jacksonville, SR 15 was rerouted onto it; the old route is now SR 139 (and was first given the number SR 15A).

Major intersections

References

015
015
015
015
015
015
015
015
015
015
015
015
015
015
015
015
015
035
035
035
035
035
035